Hollyford may refer to:

Hollyford, County Tipperary, Ireland
Hollyford Track, in New Zealand
Hollyford River, in New Zealand